Manuel Summers Rivero (26 March 1935 – 12 June 1993) was a Spanish film director, screenwriter and actor.

Biography
Father of  David Summers Rodríguez leading singer of Pop group Hombres G and of Cheyenne Summers, Spanish voice actress, and brother of  journalist Guillermo Summers, was born in Seville and later made adoptive son of Lepe, Huelva. His family originated from England.

He died in Sevilla on 12 June 1993 aged 58 from colorectal cancer.

Filmography 

Filmography as Film Director:

El Viejecito (1959). Proyecto de fin de carrera para el Instituto de Ciencias Cinematográficas de Madrid.
Del rosa al amarillo (1963). Award at San Sebastian Film Festival.
La niña de luto (1964). Entered into the 1964 Cannes Film Festival.
El juego de la oca (1966).
Juguetes rotos (1966). Premio Especial del Jurado en el Festival de Cine de Valladolid.
¿Por qué te engaña tu marido? (1969).
Urtáin, el rey de la selva... o así (1969).
Adiós, cigüeña, adiós (1971).
Ángeles gordos (1980). Coproduction with United States filmed in  New York City.
To er mundo é güeno (1982).
To er mundo é... ¡mejó! (1982).
La Biblia en pasta (1984).
To er mundo é... ¡demasiao! (1985).
Me hace falta un bigote (1986).
Sufre Mamón (1987).
Suéltate el pelo (1988).

Filmography as actor:

The Art of Living (1965)
La niña de luto, by Manuel Summers.
Aunque la hormona se vista de seda...., by Vicente Escrivá (1971).
Black story. La historia negra de Peter P. Peter, by Pedro Lazaga (1971).
Vente a Alemania, Pepe, by Pedro Lazaga (1971).
Polvo eres..., by Vicente Escrivá (1974).
De profesión: polígamo, by Angelino Fons (1975).
Me hace falta un bigote, by Manuel Summers.

Filmography as producer:

La niña de luto, by Manuel Summers.

Filmography as screenwriter:

Del rosa al amarillo, by Manuel Summers.
Urtáin, el rey de la selva... o así, by Manuel Summers.

References

External links
 http://imdb.com/name/nm0838757/

1935 births
1993 deaths
Spanish film directors
Spanish people of English descent
People from Seville
Deaths from colorectal cancer
Deaths from cancer in Spain